Camp Lanowa, and its sister Camps of Kiwago and Wakonda, are non-profit camps run by Homes for the Homeless, a non-profit operator of homeless shelters in New York City. Homelessness is a worrying and relatively large problem in New York City, with approximately 100,000 experiencing homelessness each year. Such an environment can frequently lead to a difficult upbringing for children unfortunate enough to find themselves in this position. The result is that many children grow up unable to experience the sort of childhood so often taken for granted; material goods are often unattainable; on occasion families cannot afford to adequately clothe or even feed their children and additionally, such children miss out on experiences often regarded as a rite of passage, instead condemned to a childhood of tough city living. Against this background, Camp Lanowa and its sister camps attempt to offer such opportunities to these children and provide an escape from the tough inner city life.

Overview
Camp Lanowa is the larger of the two summer camps operated by Homes for the Homeless.  Situated in Harriman State Park, New York, Lanowa runs three sessions lasting approximately two weeks each throughout the summer for under privileged children from New York. Camp Lanowa caters for an 'older' age range of around 10–14 years old, although variations are possible; its sister camp, Camp Wakonda, caters to  younger children as young as 7 years old.

The HFH camps offer the opportunity for underprivileged children to experience life away from the daily grind of city life and enjoy the wonders of the natural world; many of the children attending camp have never experienced the 'great outdoors'. Many activities are offered with the duel aims of enriching the children's life by offering opportunities to experience the wonderment of the outdoor world and by offering activities which are both aimed to be fun and educational. These include; Arts and Crafts, Computers, Learning Centre, Nature, Swimming, fishing, evening activities and overnight camping trips, to name but a few. The camp is staffed by a wide variety of people from different cultures and countries, which adds to the life enhancing experience for both the children and indeed the staff. The HFH Camps operate on a non-profit basis.

References

External links

Harriman State Park (New York)
Lanowa